Kumaun University is a state university headquartered in Nainital, Uttarakhand, India. 

In 2017, it hosted the first Kautik Student Film Festival.

Campuses 
The academic wing of the University is spread over in three campuses (D.S.B. Campus, Nainital, SSJ Campus, Almora and newly constructed Campus at Bhimtal) with an area of 5,31,373 sq.mt. (160 acres), the total built up area being 3,00,000 sq. mt.

Faculties 
1. Faculty of Arts (Drawing and Painting, Economics, English, Geography, Hindi, History, Home Science, Music, Political Science, Psychology, Sanskrit, Sociology and Tourism)

2. Faculty of Science (Botany, Forestry, Chemistry, Computer Science, Geology. Mathematics, Physics, Statistics, Zoology, Biotechnology, Information Technology and G.I. Science)

3. Faculty of Commerce (B.Com., B.Com.(Hon.), M.Com.)

4. Faculty of Management (BBA, MBA, P.G. Diploma in Tourism, MBA in Tourism, MBA Executive, MBA Rural Management)

5. Faculty of Education (B. Ed. and M. Ed.)

6. Faculty of Law (LL.B. and LL.M.)

7. Faculty of Technology (B. Pharma, and M. Pharma.)

8. Faculty of Visual Arts (B.F.A. and M.F.A.)

UGC-Academic Staff College
The UGC-Academic Staff College, Kumaun University, Nainital was sanctioned by the UGC, New Delhi on 10 October 2006 and started its first orientation programme on 12 February 2007. In addition to conducting orientation programmes and refresher courses, the UGC-ASC undertakes a number of extension activities.

UGC-ASC Nainital conducted short-term courses (2–6 days) for the senior faculty and professional development programme for non-teaching staff.

References

External links

 

Universities in Uttarakhand
Education in Nainital
Educational institutions established in 1973
1973 establishments in Uttar Pradesh